Juan Vicente Herrera Campo (born 23 January 1956 in Burgos) is a Spanish politician who served as President of the Junta of Castile and León from 2001 to 2019 and a member of the conservative People's Party.

He was spokesperson for his party's parliamentary group in the regional parliament since 1995 until 2001 when Juan José Lucas, then President of the regional government, was appointed Minister of the Presidency and Herrera was named new President.

He likes to visit the Camino de Santiago (Way of St. James), which he usually visits during holidays.

References

1956 births
Living people
Presidents of the Junta of Castile and León
People's Party (Spain) politicians
People from Burgos
Members of the 4th Cortes of Castile and León
Members of the 5th Cortes of Castile and León
Members of the 6th Cortes of Castile and León
Members of the 7th Cortes of Castile and León
Members of the 8th Cortes of Castile and León
Members of the 9th Cortes of Castile and León